The Code of Canons of the Eastern Churches (CCEC; , abbreviated CCEO) is the title of the 1990 work which is a codification of the common portions of the canon law for the 23 Eastern Catholic Churches in the Catholic Church. It is divided into 30 titles and has a total of 1546 canons. The code entered into force in 1991.

The western Latin Church is governed by its own particular code, the 1983 Code of Canon Law.

History of codification
The 23 sui iuris Churches which collectively make up the Eastern Catholic Churches had been invited by the Catholic Church to codify their own particular laws and submit them to the pope so that there may be a full, complete code of all religious law within Eastern Catholicism. Pope John Paul II promulgated the Code of Canons of the Eastern Churches on 18 October 1990, by the document Sacri Canones. The code came into force of law on 1 October 1991.

Language

The official language of the canon law common to all the Eastern Catholic Churches (called "common law") is Latin. Although Latin is the language of the Latin Church and not of the Eastern Churches, Latin was chosen as the language of the common law because there is no common language in use among all the Eastern Catholic Churches. The members of these churches use a diversity of languages, including Greek, Arabic, Romanian, Malayalam, English, French, Spanish, and Portuguese, but no single one of these languages could be used as the language of the common law. Latin was chosen because it has a long history of legal and juridical tradition and was suitable for serving as the common text from which translations could be made.

Emendations

Ad Tuendam Fidem
In 1998, Pope John Paul II issued the motu proprio Ad Tuendam Fidem, which amended two canons (750 and 1371) of the 1983 Code of Canon Law and two canons (598 and 1436) of the Code of Canons of the Eastern Churches, so as to add "new norms which expressly impose the obligation of upholding truths proposed in a definitive way by the Magisterium of the Church, and which also establish related canonical sanctions".

Mitis et Misericors Iesus

On 15 August 2015, Pope Francis issued the motu proprio Mitis et Misericors Iesus which amended canons 1357-1377 of the CCEO. It reformed the procedures for matrimonial nullity trials and instituted a briefer process.

Competentias quasdam decernere 

The motu proprio Competentias quasdam decernere issued 15 February 2022 changed some canons.

Division 
The text of the CCEO is divided into 31 sections, 30 titles and a section of preliminary canons.

Preliminary canons 
The six preliminary canons deal with scope and continuity, what is affected by the CCEO and how prior legislation and customs shall be handled.

Can. 1 The CCEO regards solely the Eastern Catholic Churches unless otherwise mentioned.

Can. 2 The CCEO is to be assessed according to the Ancient Laws of the Eastern Churches.

Can. 3 The CCEO does not "for the most part legislate on liturgical matters" and therefore the liturgical books are to be observed unless contrary to the canons of the CCEO.

Can. 4. The CCEO neither degrades or abrogates treaties/pacts entered into by the Holy See with nations and political societies. Therefore, they still have their force, notwithstanding any prescriptions of the CCEO to the contrary.

Churches sui iuris and rites 

A church sui iuris is "a community of the Christian faithful, which is joined together by a hierarchy according to the norm of law and which is expressly or tacitly recognized as sui iuris by the supreme authority of the Church" (CCEO, can. 27). The term sui iuris is an innovation of the CCEO, and denotes the relative autonomy of the Eastern Catholic Churches. This canonical term, pregnant with many juridical nuances, indicates the God-given mission of the Eastern Catholic Churches to preserve their patrimonial autonomous nature. The autonomy of these churches is relative in the sense that they are under the authority of the Bishop of Rome.

See also
Canon law (Catholic Church)
1983 Code of Canon Law
1917 Code of Canon Law
Roman Catholic (term)

Notes

References

Bibliography
 Faris, John D., & Jobe Abbass, OFM Conv., eds. A Practical Commentary to the Code of Canons of the Eastern Churches, 2 vols. Montréal: Librairie Wilson & Lafleur, 2019.
 Panteleimon Rodopoulos. An Overview of Orthodox Canon Law. Edited by George Dion Dragas. Orthodox Research Institute, 2007.

External links
Codex Canonum Ecclesiarum Orientalium, Latin editio typica of the Code
"Code of Canons of Eastern Churches", English translation
Text of Sacri Canones, issued by Pope John Paul II at the promulgation of the Code of Canons of the Eastern Churches

Eastern Catholicism
Eastern Catholic canon law
E